Padraic Fiacc (born Patrick Joseph O'Connor; 15 April 1924 – 21 January 2019) was an Irish poet, and member of Aosdána, the exclusive Irish Arts Academy.

Biographical information
Born Patrick Joseph O'Connor in Belfast to Bernard and Annie (née McGarry) O'Connor, Fiacc's father was a barman who left for the United States when Fiacc was very young. Fiacc resided with his maternal grandparents who had recently moved to the Markets area of South Belfast after being burned out of their home in Lisburn in which all their furniture was burned by anti-Catholic rioters.

His family emigrated to the United States in the late 1920s and he grew up in New York City. He returned to Belfast in 1946 where he lived for four years before returning to New York in 1950; he grew up in Hell's Kitchen. The multicultural influences, coupled with the poverty and violence of the neighbourhood impacted Fiacc's outlook and his writing, especially his early writing.

Education and early writing
He attended Commerce High School and later changed to Haaren High School to learn Latin. While at school, he produced several original plays and his first collection of poetry titled Innisfail Lost. The poems were reviewed by Padraic Colum who became a mentor to Fiacc, directing him away from themes of coming to America and encouraging him to research and write about his own people's history. Fiacc had already developed a distaste for America and found himself longing for Ireland as he dug deeper into its history and literary technique and style.

Seminary was Padraic's next step. He attended St. Joseph's Seraphic Seminary and later studied with the Irish Capuchin Order for a total of three years spanning 1941–44. He includes in his main reasons for leaving the path to priesthood his lack of disciplinary habits and longing for a freer existence.

Relocation
On leaving the seminary, and to avoid signing up for military service, he returned to Belfast in 1946 where he lived for four years during which time his poetry was published in several magazines and the 1948 volume of New Irish Poets. Fiacc was the youngest poet in that edition. Publications of Fiacc's work from this time may be found in Irish Bookman, Irish Times, Poetry Ireland, and Rann.

In 1952, upon the death of his mother, Fiacc returned to New York to look after his alcoholic father and younger siblings. It was during this time that he met his soon-to-be wife Nancy, who had read and enjoyed some of his early writings. Fiacc was unsettled and returned to Belfast in 1956, settling in Glengormley, a suburb of North Belfast, where they had a baby girl in 1962. He subsequently published a steady stream of poetry and other works.

Life in Belfast
Fiacc continued to write and won the 1957 AE Memorial Award. 1969 was a momentous year for Fiacc.  The publishing of his first volume of poetry came alongside the return of pervasive violence. The breakdown of his marriage and his nerves, and the murder of a close friend, Gerry McLaughlin, ensued, as did his edited collection of poetry by his contemporaries surrounding the topic of the troubling times in Northern Ireland, The Wearing of the Black.

In the early 1970s, he met poet Gerald Dawe with whom he met regularly, corresponded, and later acted as mentor. Dawe published a steady stream of poetry and other pieces, and still resides in Belfast. He was a member of Aosdána, the Irish Arts Academy. In the 1980s, Fiacc collaborated with Seamus Carmichael, who produced a series of color linoleum prints, three based on poems from the "Missa Terriblis" collection and 7 based on work from "Woe to the Boy". These images were widely exhibited in Ireland in 1985 and 1986.

Many artists have depicted the poet such as Neil Shawcross, Paul Bradley, Dan Dowling, Michael McKernon, Úna O'Grady, Rory Lambe and Photographers such as Frankie Quinn, Stevie Raeylon (Chicago) and Bill Kirk.

Death
Padraic Fiacc died on 21 January 2019 in Belfast, Northern Ireland, aged 95.

Books
 Woe to the Boy (1957)
 By the Black Stream (Dublin, The Dolmen Press, 1969)
 Odour of Blood (Kildare, The Goldsmith Press, 1973)
 Nights in the Bad Place (Belfast, The Blackstaff Press, 1977)
 The Selected Padraic Fiacc (The Blackstaff Press, 1979)
 Missa Terriblis (The Blackstaff Press, 1986)
 Ruined Pages: Selected poems (edited by Gerald Dawe and Aodán Mac Póilin), Belfast: Blackstaff Press, 1994
 Semper vacare (Belfast, The Lagan Press, 1999)
 Red Earth (The Lagan Press). 
 The Wearing of the Black (Editor; The Blackstaff Press, 1974).
 SEA – sixty years of poetry (Edited and illustrated by Michael McKernon) MH Press 2006
 IN MY OWN HAND – poems written in the poets own hand. (Edited and illustrated by Michael McKernon)MH Press, 2012
 SEA – sixty years of poetry Padraic Fiacc - A Review and Critical Analysis by Dr Margaret Wright,(MH PRESS, 2020)

Film/Theatre
 'Der Bomben Poet' a film by Georg Stephan Troller, 1980 (BXW)
 'A Tribute To Pádraic Fiacc' a short film by Michael McKernon, 2006 
 'STORMBIRD - Pádraic Fiacc in his own Words, Poems and Images' in Cinematic Theatre format, by Michael McKernon, 2015

Awards
 Æ Memorial Award (1957)
 Poetry Ireland Award (1981)

Reviews
 Murphy, Hayden (1980), review of The Selected Padraic Fiacc and The Wearing of the Black, in Bold, Christine (ed.), Cencrastus No. 2, Spring 1980, pp. 47 – 49.

References

Further reading
 Brown, John, In the Chair: Interviews with Poets from the North of Ireland. Salmon Publishing, 2002.
 Fiacc, Padraic, Ruined Pages: Selected poems. Eds Gerald Dawe and Aodán Mac Póilin. Belfast: Blackstaff Press, 1994.

External links
 Official website 
  The Maverick of Irish Poetry
 Aosdána

1924 births
2019 deaths
Irish poets
Writers from Belfast
Writers from Manhattan
Aosdána members
Male writers from Northern Ireland
21st-century writers from Northern Ireland
Haaren High School alumni
People from Hell's Kitchen, Manhattan